was a Japanese woodblock print artist, working in a style that combines influences from traditional Japanese ukiyo-e prints and Western painting.

He studied oil painting at Tama Art College but left in 1947.

From 1962 to 1965 he lived in Milan, Italy and then England. He taught at Bath Academy of Arts.

Motifs in his work include butterflies, horses, cranes, and girls with long flowing hair. Some of his later pieces were inspired by Persian, Byzantine and Renaissance styles.

His catalogue raisonné is Tadashi Nakayama: His Life and Work, by Kappy Hendricks and Marshall Hendricks.

His work is held in several museums, including the Asian Art Museum in San Francisco, the Minneapolis Institute of Art, the Los Angeles County Museum of Art, the Santa Barbara Museum of Art, the National Museum of Asian Art, the Carnegie Museum of Art, the Seattle Art Museum, the University of Michigan Museum of Art, the Brooklyn Museum, the Portland Art Museum, the Indianapolis Museum of Art, the Fine Arts Museum of San Francisco, the Harvard Art Museums, and the Honolulu Museum of Art.

Notes

1927 births
2014 deaths
Japanese printmakers
20th-century Japanese artists
21st-century Japanese artists
People from Niigata (city)
Artists from Niigata Prefecture
20th-century printmakers
21st-century printmakers